José Ginés (born 18 February 1946) is a Spanish gymnast. He competed in seven events at the 1972 Summer Olympics.

References

1946 births
Living people
Spanish male artistic gymnasts
Olympic gymnasts of Spain
Gymnasts at the 1972 Summer Olympics
Gymnasts from Madrid